Monaco Hebdo is a weekly newspaper in Monaco. It was established in September 1995. As of 2007, it had a circulation of 3,000. It is published by the Caroli Group.

See also
 List of newspapers in Monaco

References

Mass media in Monaco
Publications established in 1995
French-language newspapers published in Europe
Weekly newspapers